Anne Marie Macari (born 1939) is an American poet.

Life and career 
Macari was born in Queens, New York.<ref>{{cite web | url = http://www.wnyc.org/news/articles/21935 | work =  WNYC News | title = Yankees Land in World Series: It's Pure Poetry |date=2011-06-28 }} </ref> She is a graduate of Oberlin College and holds an MFA in creative writing from Sarah Lawrence College. Macari founded and teaches in the Drew University MFA Program for Poetry & Poetry in Translation. She has also taught on the faculty of the Prague Summer Seminars.  She is a member of the Alice James Books Cooperative Board.

Macari has published five books of poetry, including Heaven Beneath (Persea, 2020). Her first book, Ivory Cradle, won The APR/Honickman First Book Prize in Poetry. Macari's poems have been published in many literary journals and magazines, including TriQuarterly, Bloomsbury Review, Shenandoah, The American Poetry Review, Five Points (as winner of the James Dickey Prize for Poetry), The Cortland Review, and The Iowa Review. Her work has appeared in anthologies, including From the Fishhouse (Persea Books, 2009) and Never Before: Poems About First Experiences (Four Way Books).

Macari has read her poetry throughout the United States in many venues, including the Dodge Poetry Festival.  She has also read her work at festivals in England, Austria, and in Prague.  She lives in New York City and Miami Beach, Florida. Her partner was poet Gerald Stern.

Awards
 Ivory Cradle, winner, The APR/Honickman First Book Prize in Poetry

 Published works 
 Heaven Beneath (Persea) 2020
 Red Deer (Persea) 2015
 She Heads into the Wilderness (Autumn House Press, 2008)
 Gloryland (Alice James Books), 2005
 Ivory Cradle'' (Copper Canyon Press, 2000)

References

External links 
 Audio: Fishousepoems Website
 Audio: The Cortland Review > Anne Marie Macari
 Autumn House Press > Author Page > Anne Marie Macari
 Audio: Reading and Interview on WYEP Radio on Prosody with Jan Beatty
 Article on Gloryland: Literature and Theology (OUP) September 2011, pp. 297-311

1955 births
Living people
Poets from New Jersey
Oberlin College alumni
Sarah Lawrence College alumni
Poets from New York (state)
People from Lambertville, New Jersey
Drew University faculty
American women poets
American women academics
21st-century American women